The Unisexers is an Australian television soap opera made by the Cash Harmon Television production company,  (best known for creating the soap opera Number 96), it ran for a single season for the Nine Network in 1975.

Synopsis 
The Unisexers focused on a group of young people - both male and female - living together in a commune arrangement in the old house of a retired elderly couple whose children had left home. The youngsters set up a business making denim jeans to be worn by both sexes, hence the title of "Unisexers".

Cast 
 Walter Pym as Angus Melody
 Jessica Noad as Dora Melody
 Delore Whiteman as Mrs Tripp
 Tina Bursill as Felicity
 Michele Fawdon as Monica Parry
 Josephine Knur as Sally Pickles
 Tony Sheldon as Benjy Lewis 
 Steven Tandy as Julian "Tinsel" Tinsley
 Patrick Ward as Cornelius "Corny" Hastings
 Anne Grigg as Deirdre
 Sonia Hoffmann as Brigitte  
 Scott Lambert as Brian Parry
 Hugh Logan as Humphrey 'Humph' Brown

Tenure 
The series, hampered by an early evening time slot, failed to find an audience and was cancelled and removed from the television schedules after three weeks. In total a one-hour premiere pilot episode and fifteen thirty-minute episodes were broadcast.

References

External links
Aussie Soap Archive: The Unisexers
 

Australian television soap operas
Nine Network original programming
1975 Australian television series debuts
1975 Australian television series endings
Television series by Cash Harmon Television
English-language television shows